Podlog pod Bohorjem is a settlement east of Planina pri Sevnici in the Municipality of Šentjur, eastern Slovenia. The settlement, and the entire municipality, are included in the Savinja Statistical Region, which is in the Slovenian portion of the historical Duchy of Styria.

Name
The name of the settlement was changed from Podlog to Podlog pod Bohorjem in 1953.

Cultural heritage
A small Neo-Gothic chapel in the settlement is dedicated to Our Lady of Lourdes. It was built in 1896.

References

External links
Podlog pod Bohorjem at Geopedia

Populated places in the Municipality of Šentjur